Adlan Aliyevich Abdurashidov (born 31 July 1990) is a Russian boxer. He competed in the men's lightweight event at the 2016 Summer Olympics.

References

External links
 
 
 
 

1990 births
Living people
Russian male boxers
Olympic boxers of Russia
Boxers at the 2016 Summer Olympics
Universiade medalists in boxing
Universiade gold medalists for Russia
Lightweight boxers
Medalists at the 2013 Summer Universiade
Moscow State Mining University alumni